Yasmin, Yasmine, or Yasmina may refer to:

People
 Yasmin (given name), a feminine given name, and sometimes surname
 Yasmin (musician) (born 1993), English singer, songwriter, and DJ
 Yasmine (pornographic actress), Yasmine Lafitte, French actress
 Yasmine (singer) (1972–2009), Belgian singer, presenter and television personality

Film
 Yasmina (film), a 1927 French silent film directed by André Hugon
 Yasmin (1955 film), an Indian Hindi-language film directed by Abdur Rashid Kardar
 Yasmin (2004 film), a British/German film directed by Kenneth Glenaan
 Yasmine (film), a 2014 Bruneian film directed by Siti Kamaluddin

Other uses
 Yasmin (drug), marketing name of the birth control pill ethinylestradiol/drospirenone
 Yasmin, a doll in the Bratz fashion doll line

See also
Jasmin (disambiguation)
Jasmine (disambiguation)
Yasemin (disambiguation)

fr:Yasmine
tr:Yasmin